William Copeland Wallace (May 21, 1856 – September 4, 1901) was a U.S. Representative from New York.

Born in Brooklyn, New York, Wallace graduated from Adelphi Academy, Brooklyn, New York, in 1873, from Wesleyan University, Middletown, Connecticut, in 1876, and from the law department of Columbia College (now Columbia University), New York City, in 1878.
He commenced the practice of law in New York City.
He served as assistant United States Attorney for the United States District Court for the Southern District of New York in 1880–1883.
He was appointed judge advocate general on the staff of Governor Morton in 1894.

Wallace was elected as a Republican to the Fifty-first Congress (March 4, 1889 – March 3, 1891).
He was an unsuccessful candidate for reelection in 1890 to the Fifty-second Congress.
He resumed the practice of his profession in Brooklyn, New York.
He also engaged extensively in banking.
He died at his summer home in Warwick, New York, September 4, 1901.
He was interred in Greenwood Cemetery, Brooklyn, New York.

References

1856 births
1901 deaths
Wesleyan University alumni
Columbia Law School alumni
Adelphi University alumni
Burials at Green-Wood Cemetery
People from Warwick, New York
Republican Party members of the United States House of Representatives from New York (state)
19th-century American politicians